Iron Jawed Angels is a 2004 American historical drama film directed by Katja von Garnier. The film stars Hilary Swank as suffragist leader Alice Paul, Frances O'Connor as activist Lucy Burns, Julia Ormond as Inez Milholland, and Anjelica Huston as Carrie Chapman Catt. It received critical acclaim after the film premiered at the 2004 Sundance Film Festival.

The film focuses on the American women's suffrage movement during the 1910s and follows women's suffrage leaders Alice Paul and Lucy Burns as they use peaceful and effective nonviolent strategies, tactics, and dialogues to revolutionize the American feminist movement to grant women the right to vote. The film was released in the United States on February 15, 2004.

Plot
Alice Paul and Lucy Burns return from England where they met while participating in the Women's Social and Political Union started by radical suffragette leader Emmeline Pankhurst and led by her daughter Christabel Pankhurst. The pair presents a plan to the National American Woman's Suffrage Association (NAWSA) to campaign directly in Washington D.C. for national voting rights for women. They find that their ideas are too forceful for the established suffragist leaders in the U.S., particularly Carrie Chapman Catt, but they are allowed to lead the NAWSA Congressional Committee in D.C. They start by organizing the 1913 Woman Suffrage Procession on the eve of President Woodrow Wilson's inauguration.

While soliciting donations at an art gallery, Paul convinces labor lawyer Inez Milholland to lead the parade on a white horse. Paul also meets a Washington newspaper political cartoonist, Ben Weissman (a fictional character), and there are hints of romantic overtones. In a fictional scene, Paul tries to explain to Ida B. Wells why she wants African American women to march in the back of the parade in order to not anger southern Democrats and activists, but Wells refuses, and she comes out of the crowd to join a white group during the middle of the parade. After disagreements over fundraising, Paul and Burns are forced out of the NAWSA, and they found the National Woman's Party (NWP) to support their approach. Alice Paul briefly explores a romantic relationship with Ben Weissman.

Further conflicts within the movement are portrayed as NAWSA leaders criticize NWP tactics, such as protesting against Wilson, and their sustained picketing outside of the White House in the Silent Sentinels action. Relations between the American government and the NWP protesters also intensify, as many women are arrested for their actions and charged with "obstructing traffic."

The arrested women are sent to the Occoquan Workhouse for 60-day terms. Despite abusive and terrorizing treatment, Paul and other women undertake a hunger strike, during which paid guards force-feed them milk and raw eggs. The suffragists are blocked from seeing visitors or lawyers, until (fictional) U.S. Senator Tom Leighton visits his wife Emily, one of the imprisoned women. News of their treatment leaks to the media after Emily secretly passes a letter to her husband during his visit. Paul, Burns, and the other women are released.

Pressure continues to be put on President Wilson as the NAWSA joins in the NWP call for passage of the Nineteenth Amendment to the United States Constitution. Wilson finally accedes to the pressure rather than be called out in the international press for fighting for democracy in Europe while denying democracy's benefits to half of the U.S. population. During the amendment's ratification, Harry T. Burn, a member of the Tennessee legislature, receives a telegram from his mother at the last minute, changes his vote, and the amendment passes.

Origin of title
The film derives its title from Massachusetts Representative Joseph Walsh, who in 1917 opposed the creation of a committee to deal with women's suffrage. Walsh thought the creation of a committee would be yielding to "the nagging of iron-jawed angels" and referred to the Silent Sentinels as "bewildered, deluded creatures with short skirts and short hair." The use of steel holding open the jaws of the women being force-fed after the Silent Sentinel arrests and hunger strike is also a plot point in the film.

Cast

Fictional characters
The fictional characters in the film are Ben Weissman; his child; Emily Leighton; and Senator Tom Leighton.

Reception

Critical response
Film critic Richard Roeper gave the film a positive review, writing, "Iron Jawed Angels is an important history lesson told in a fresh, and blazing fashion." Scott Faundas of Variety gave the film a negative review, writing, "HBO's starry suffragette drama, Iron Jawed Angels, latches on to a worthy historical subject and then hopes noble intentions will be enough to carry the day. Alas, there's no such luck in this talky, melodramatic overview of the dawn of equal rights for women in America. Gussied up with a comically anachronistic use of period music on the soundtrack and flashy, MTV-style montage sequences, pic misguidedly strives – but ultimately fails – to belie its instincts as an assembly-line movie-of-the-week."

Robert Pardi of TV Guide gave a mixed review, "All the elements for a splendid film about the early days of the women's rights are in place, but director Katja von Garnier's use of distracting cinematic trickery and jarringly modern music meshes poorly with the period setting... Blessed with a flawless physical production, von Garnier distorts her epic tale with music that belongs on a Lilith Fair tour; it sometimes feels as though she and her writers conceived the fight for women's suffrage as a 1912 version of Sex and the City. Only when the anachronisms finally subside in the film's final third is the moving core is allowed to shine."

Historians have been critical about the movie for several reasons. Director Katja von Garnier created a 21st-century soundtrack and remade the early 20th-century suffragists into "third-wave" feminists that would be more familiar to modern audiences. The depiction of Alice Paul's sexuality in the film had no basis in historic fact; Paul was single-minded in her devotion to winning suffrage for women. There is no evidence she had a sexually intimate relationship with anyone, male or female. The movie even creates a fictional character to play a love interest for Paul, cartoonist Ben Weissman. This suggests that Paul needed the assistance of a newspaperman to get publicity for her activist campaign, when in reality, Paul was a highly talented publicist in her own right.

The film was also portrayed Paul welcoming Ida B. Wells-Barnett with a smile when Wells-Barnett joined the procession from the mass of spectators along the route. This never happened in reality, and was perhaps the director's attempt to soften the event's racist aspect. Paul marched in the college section in her cap and gown, not with the Illinois delegation that Wells-Barnett joined. Wells-Barnett marched with two white Illinois women who had supported her right to march with the state delegation: Belle Squire and Virginia Brooks.

Accolades
The film was nominated for five awards at 56th Primetime Emmy Awards, none of which were won; three awards at the 62nd Golden Globe Awards, winning one; and two awards at the 9th Golden Satellite Awards, winning one. Anjelica Huston won the Golden Globe Award for Best Supporting Actress – Series, Miniseries or Television Film and the Satellite Award for Best Supporting Actress – Series, Miniseries or Television Film for her performance in the film.

See also
 Jailed for Freedom (1920 book)
 Shoulder to Shoulder (1974 series)
 Suffragette (2015 film)
 Suffs (2022 musical)

Notes

References

External links

 
 

2004 films
2000s historical drama films
Films about activists
Films about Quakers
2000s feminist films
HBO Films films
Progressive Era in the United States
National Woman's Party
Alice Paul
Films directed by Katja von Garnier
American historical drama films
Films scored by Reinhold Heil
Films scored by Johnny Klimek
2004 drama films
Films set in the 1910s
American drama television films
2000s English-language films
2000s American films